Barocco is a 1976 French film directed by  André Téchiné.

Barocco may also refer to:
Barocco (1925 film), French silent film
 Rocco Barocco (born 1944), Italian fashion designer
Barocco, former name of the Red Dress (embroidery project)

See also
Baroque (disambiguation)